The ash-colored tapaculo (Myornis senilis) is a species of bird in the family Rhinocryptidae. It is found in Colombia, Ecuador, and Peru.

Taxonomy and systematics

The ash-colored tapaculo is the only member of its genus and has no subspecies. It has sometimes been placed in the large genus Scytalopus.

Description

Males weigh  and females . The adult's upper parts are medium gray and the underparts a lighter gray. Some have cinnamon on the flanks and crissum. The juvenile's upper parts are reddish brown and the underparts ochre brown. There are some differences in measurements and the darkness of the plumage between populations on either side of the Andes.

Distribution and habitate

The ash-colored tapaculo is found in all three Andean ranges in Colombia and south through Ecuador to Peru's departments of Huánuco and Pasco. It prefers dense Chusquea bamboo and Neurolepis cane thickets in the forest or forest margins.

Behavior

Feeding

The ash-colored tapaculo's diet has not been studied.

Breeding

Very little is known about the ash-colored tapaculo's breeding phenology. Fledglings have been noted in June in Ecuador and in August in Peru.

Vocalization

The ash-colored tapaculo's song is complex. It begins with "tick" repeated irregularly for up to a minute, followed by a three to four second trill described as "hysterical laughter" which is then often repeated . The alarm call is a dry trill.

Status

The IUCN has assessed the ash-colored tapaculo as being of Least Concern. It occupies a large range and the population appears to be stable though its number is not known. It occurs in protected areas in Ecuador.

References

ash-colored tapaculo
Birds of the Colombian Andes
Birds of the Ecuadorian Andes
Birds of the Peruvian Andes
ash-colored tapaculo
Taxonomy articles created by Polbot